Black Rose is the sixth studio album by American singer Tyrese. It was released independently on July 10, 2015 through his label Voltron Recordz, while distribution was handled by Caroline Records. The production on the album was handled by Warryn Campbell, Seige Monstracity, Eric Hudson, B.A.M., Tim Kelley, Marcus Hodge and Rockwilder. The album also features guest appearances by Chrisette Michele, Snoop Dogg, Brandy and Tank.

Black Rose spawned four singles: "Dumb Shit", "Shame", "Waiting On You" and "Prior to You". The album received positive reviews from music critics and was a commercial success. It debuted at number one on the US Billboard 200 and US Top R&B/Hip-Hop Albums, selling 83,000 copies in its first week. At the 58th Grammy Awards, "Shame" received two nominations for Best Traditional R&B Performance and Best R&B Song.

Background
In 2006, Tyrese released his fourth studio album Alter Ego which did not score any Hot 100 hits or major R&B hits. He took some time off from music to focus on his family and his acting career. He appeared in the films Waist Deep, Legion and the Transformers franchise. In 2011, after a five-year hiatus, he released his fifth studio album Open Invitation. The album performed better than its predecessor, debuting and peaking at number 9 on the US Billboard Top 200 album chart, becoming his highest-charting album at the time. The album received a nomination for Best R&B Album at the 55th Grammy Awards, losing to Robert Glasper Experiment's Black Radio. In 2013, Tyrese, along with his music friends Tank and Ginuwine, released their debut collaboration album under the group name TGT entitled Three Kings. Tyrese then took another hiatus from music and resumed acting, appearing in the movies Fast and Furious 6, Furious 7 and Black Nativity. It was announced that his next solo album would be released in 2014 as a double album. This album became Black Rose, and was released in the summer of 2015.

Singles
The first single, "Dumb Shit" was released on November 5, 2014. The song failed to chart on the US Billboard Hot 100 and the US R&B chart. The second single "Shame" was released April 28, 2015. The song also failed to chart on the US Hot 100, but peaked at number 32 on the US R&B chart. Two additional singles were released, "Waiting On You" and "Prior to You" which were released on May 10, 2016 and both failed to chart.

Critical reception

Black Rose received generally positive reviews from critics, "Seventeen years after his solo debut, and two years after his Top Five album with Tank and Ginuwine as TGT, Tyrese has come up with a surprisingly modest, ballad-rich collection seemingly devised with longevity in mind. Should this turn out to be Tyrese's last album, as the singer threatened prior to its release, it will finish his music career on a high note." A review by Allmusic's Andy Kellman.

Commercial performance
In the US market, music industry forecasters predicted that the album would earn at least 70,000 equivalent units as of July 16. Black Rose exceeded its predictions, debuting at number one on the US Billboard 200 chart, earning 83,000 album-equivalent units in its first week. This became Tyrese's first US number-one debut and his third US top-ten album. The album also debuted at number one on the US Top R&B/Hip-Hop Albums chart. The album debuted in Billboard's issue of August 1st, the first issue that Nielsen SoundScan changed their tracking week from Monday through Sunday to Friday through Thursday due to Global Release Date. In its second week, the album dropped to number three on the chart, earning an additional 50,000 units. In its third week, the album dropped to number ten on the chart, earning 26,000 more units. As of August 2015, the album has sold 172,000 copies in the United States.

Track listing

Personnel
Credits adapted from liner notes.

 Tyrese Gibson - primary artist, writer, executive producer, A&R, art direction, design
 Isabella Castro - co-executive producer
 Harvey Mason, Jr. - vocal production
 Andrew Hey - recording engineer

 Richard Furch - mixing
 Dave Kutch - mastering
 Robert Zuckeman, Ian Spainer - photography
 Randall Leddy - art direction, design

Charts

Weekly charts

Year-end charts

See also

 List of Billboard 200 number-one albums of 2015
 List of Billboard number-one R&B/Hip-Hop albums of 2015

References

External links
 TyreseOnline.com  — official site

2015 albums
Tyrese Gibson albums